The family Pythidae is a small group of tenebrionoid beetles with no vernacular common name, though recent authors have coined the name dead log bark beetles. There are seven genera, which are largely native to the mid-high latitude regions of the Northern Hemisphere and Australia, with one genus also present in the tropical Americas. The larvae are generally found with decaying vegetation and wood on which they feed, while adults are not associated with the larvae and are generally caught using malaise traps and light traps.

Genera
These genera belong to the family Pythidae
 Anaplopus Blackburn, 1890 Australia
 Ischyomius Chevrolat, 1878 g Central America and Northern South America
 Osphyoplesius Winkler, 1915 g Palearctic
 Priognathus LeConte, 1850 i c g b North America
 Pytho Latreille, 1796 i c g b Holarctic
 Sphalma Horn, 1872 i c g b Western North America
 Trimitomerus Horn, 1888 i c g b North America
Data sources: i = ITIS, c = Catalogue of Life, g = GBIF, b = Bugguide.net

References

Gustafsson, B. Catalogus Coleopterorum Sueciae (2004), Naturhistoriska riksmuseet, Stockholm.

Further reading

External links

 Pythidae at Fauna Europaea

Tenebrionoidea
Beetle families